Organokrypton chemistry describes the synthesis and properties of chemical compounds containing a carbon to krypton chemical bond.

Far fewer such compounds are known than organoxenon compounds. The first organokrypton compound, HKrCCH, was reported in 2003 and made by photolytic insertion of a krypton atom into acetylene. Similar work was then done on diacetylene and cyanoacetylene, producing HKrC4H and HKrC3N. All these were made in matrix isolation and are stable up to 40 K. HKrCCF and HCCKrF have also been experimentally produced in matrix isolation.

Reaction of acetylene dications with krypton produced .

References

Krypton